Kyle Russell Sullivan (born September 24, 1988) is an American  former actor, known for appearing on the TV series All That and the Fox sitcom The War at Home.

Sullivan was born in Los Angeles, California. He played the recurring character Dabney Hooper on Malcolm in the Middle from 2000 to 2003. Sullivan has also lent his voice to the characters Danny O'Farrell and Everitt Konquist on the Disney animated series Fillmore!  Sullivan has guest starred on television programs such as The Secret World of Alex Mack, Seinfeld, The Amanda Show, NewsRadio, Chicago Hope, Mad About You, ER, Scrubs, and Max Keeble's Big Move.

After retiring from acting, Sullivan moved to New York attending Columbia University, studying psychology and earning a Bachelor of Arts (B.A.) in film. He has since worked as a partner for Yitzchak Mirilashvili's venture capital firm Rainfall Ventures.

Filmography

Films
Soldier (1998)
Tuesdays with Morrie (1999)
Geppetto (2000)
Max Keeble's Big Move (2001)
The Master of Disguise (2002)
All That 10th Anniversary Reunion Special (2005)

Television
 Kino's Storytime 
 The Secret World of Alex Mack – Ryan (one episode, 1996)
 NewsRadio – Jimmy's Kid ('Rodney') (one episode, 1997)
 Seinfeld – Son (one episode, 1997)
 Chicago Hope – Spencer Clanahan (one episode, 1997)
 Mad About You - The Little Boy (one episode, 1997) Promised Land – Connor Hixon (one episode, 1998)
 Good vs Evil - Yoram (one episode, 1999)
 Cover Me: Based on the True Life of an FBI Family - Josh Evans (2000)
 ER - Nicholas Rosato (one episode, 2000)
 The Amanda Show - Himself (two episodes, 2000-2001)
 Malcolm in the Middle - Dabney Hooper (2000–2003)
 Whatever Happened to... Robot Jones? - Socks (2002–2003)
 Fillmore! - Danny O'Farrell / Ken Himmelman / Goon #1  (2002–2004)
 Scrubs - Brian (one episode, 2004)
 All That - Regular Performer / Performer (2002–2005)
 The War at Home'' – Larry Gold (2005–2007)

References

External links
 

1988 births
Living people
20th-century American male actors
21st-century American male actors
American male child actors
American male film actors
American male television actors
American male voice actors
Male actors from Los Angeles